Lance Frederick Zawadzki (born May 26, 1985) is an American former professional baseball shortstop. He played for the San Diego Padres in Major League Baseball (MLB) in 2010. Since 2018, he has been a minor league coach in the Boston Red Sox organization.

Amateur career
Zawadzki graduated from St. John's High School in Shrewsbury, Massachusetts, in 2003. He was drafted straight out of high school in the 48th round by the Montreal Expos. Choosing to go to college instead of playing in the minor leagues, he committed to attend Louisiana State University and after one year transferred to San Diego State University before the spring of 2004.

On March 11, 2004, Zawadzki became the first person to get a hit at Petco Park when he doubled off the wall as a freshman for San Diego State against Houston. It was the first game played at the stadium.

During the 2005 summer, Zawadzki played for the Wareham Gatemen in the Cape Cod Baseball League in Massachusetts alongside teammates Daniel Bard and Justin Masterson.

Following the 2006 season, Zawadzki was taken in the 15th round by the St. Louis Cardinals. He did not sign and transferred to Lee University, which played in the 2007 NAIA World Series.

Professional career

San Diego Padres
He was selected by the San Diego Padres in 4th round (147th overall) of 2007 amateur entry draft. In 2007, he appeared in 10 games for the Arizona League Padres and 25 for the Eugene Emeralds, hitting a combined .305.

In 2008, he primarily played with the Fort Wayne Wizards in the Single-A Midwest League, hitting .273. In 2009, he split the season between the Advanced A Lake Elsinore Storm and the AA San Antonio Missions and hit .285 combined in 128 games.

Zawadzki made his Major League  debut with the Padres on May 2, 2010, against the Milwaukee Brewers and recorded his first Major League hit (a single) in his first at-bat, becoming the first baseball player from Lee University to play in the Major Leagues. He appeared in only 20 games for the Padres, primarily at second base, and hit .200. In the minors that season, he was in 35 games for San Antonio and 61 for the AAA Portland Beavers, hitting .225.

Other teams
On November 5, 2010, Zawadzki was claimed off waivers by the Kansas City Royals. He received an invitation to the Royals' major league camp for the 2011 spring training. However, he spent all of the 2011 season in the minor leagues with the Omaha Storm Chasers, where he hit .233 in 91 games. He was released on October 10.

In November, 2011, Zawadzki signed a minor league contract with the Los Angeles Dodgers and was assigned to the Triple-A Albuquerque Isotopes to start the season. He battled injuries and only appeared in 5 games for the Isotopes and was hitless in 13 at-bats. The Dodgers released him on May 7.

On May 21, 2012, Zawadzki signed a minor league contract with the Atlanta Braves and was assigned to the Triple-A Gwinnett Braves.

Zawadzki signed a minor league contract with the St. Louis Cardinals on August 10, 2012, and was assigned to the Triple-A Memphis Redbirds.

On December 18, 2012, the Toronto Blue Jays announced that Zawadzki had been signed to a minor league contract with an invitation to spring training. Zawadzki was assigned to the Double-A New Hampshire Fisher Cats from the Triple-A Buffalo Bisons on July 30, 2013.

Zawadzki played with the Lancaster Barnstormers starting in 2013 and he became a free agent after the 2015 season. He resigned on March 31, 2016. On August 23, 2017, Zawadzki was traded from the Sugar Land Skeeters to the Lancaster Barnstormers. He announced his retirement from professional baseball following the 2017 season.

Post-playing career
In 2018, Zawadzki was named a coach for the Lowell Spinners, the Class A Short Season minor league affiliate of the Boston Red Sox. He served as hitting coach of the Class A-Advanced Salem Red Sox in 2019, and in January 2020 was named hitting coach of the Double-A Portland Sea Dogs.

References

External links

MiLB.com player profile

1985 births
Living people
San Diego Padres players
Arizona League Padres players
Eugene Emeralds players
San Antonio Missions players
Fort Wayne Wizards players
Lake Elsinore Storm players
Portland Beavers players
San Diego State Aztecs baseball players
Omaha Storm Chasers players
Albuquerque Isotopes players
Gwinnett Braves players
Memphis Redbirds players
Buffalo Bisons (minor league) players
Gulf Coast Blue Jays players
New Hampshire Fisher Cats players
Lancaster Barnstormers players
Peoria Saguaros players
Sugar Land Skeeters players
Mayos de Navojoa players
American expatriate baseball players in Mexico
Wareham Gatemen players